The Holborn Division was one of four divisions of the Hundred of Ossulstone, in the county of Middlesex, England.
The other divisions were named Finsbury, Kensington and Tower.

The area was to the north of the liberty of  Westminster, and was included entirely within the County of London on its creation in 1889. It gave its name to the Metropolitan Borough of Holborn created in 1900. The area is now covered by the London Borough of Camden and the northern section of the City of Westminster.

In 1829 the Holborn Division contained the following "parishes, townships, precincts and places":

The combined parishes of St Giles in the Fields and St George Bloomsbury
The combined parishes of St Andrew Holborn Above the Bars with St George the Martyr
The liberty of Saffron Hill, Hatton Garden, Ely Rents and Ely Place
The liberty of the Rolls
The parish of St Pancras
The parish of St John, Hampstead
The parish of St Marylebone
The parish of Paddington
The precinct of the Savoy

External links
Map of Divisions of Ossulstone Hundred  – the map indicates that technically the Westminster Division was an independent constituent of the Holborn Division.

Hundreds and divisions of Middlesex
History of local government in London (pre-1855)